South High School is 1 of the 32 high school located in the Kern County District of Bakersfield, California in the United States. The school has approximately 2,150 students. As of May 7, 2021 the school mascot is known as the “Spartans” following a year long review committee determination examine the prior mascot 'Rebel Man or Johnny Rebel'' which was patterned after a Confederate soldier.  Sports teams formerly referred to as the Rebels will now be known as the Spartans.

History
The official South High School website states that the school was originally founded in 1957 and was surrounded by farmlands.

Extracurricular Activities

Athletics
The school offers a variety of sports that include: baseball, swimming, dance, flag, golf,  wrestling, tennis, cross-country running, soccer, basketball, softball, volleyball, and football. In 2015–2016, the Varsity boys soccer team won the CIF Southern California Regional Championships for Division II.

South High celebrated its 50th anniversary and homecoming on September 29, 2007. The South High Rebels also hosted their 50th homecoming football game against the Shafter Generals, with South High winning 41–12.

Clubs
Clubs on campus include forensics, JROTC, and ROC.

South High is also home to the prestigious MS3 program, the brand new South High Justice Academy, the AVID program, and an award-winning Rebel Regiment Band and Color-guard.

Notable alumni

Winston Crite, NBA player, played for Texas A&M University
Michael Dallas Jr., a professional boxer in the Light Welterweight division.
Natalie Dunn,  first American woman to win the world championship in figure roller-skating in 1976.
Brent McClanahan, former running back for the Minnesota Vikings, 1973–1979.
Rick Mears, retired American race car driver and four-time Indy 500 winner.
David Silveria, Former drummer of the band Korn.

References

External links
 Official Site

Educational institutions established in 1957
High schools in Bakersfield, California
Public high schools in California
1957 establishments in California